is a Japanese professional shogi player ranked 7-dan.

Tonari invented the Tonari opening, which is named after him.

Early life
Tonari was born on January 17, 1990, in Miyazaki, Miyazaki. As a young boy, he learned how to play shogi from watching his father and older brother playing each other. In 2000, Tonari defeated fellow future professional Taichi Nakamura to win the 25th  as a fifth-grade student at Miyazaki Ehira Elementary School.

Tonari entered the Japan Shogi Association's apprentice school at the rank of 6-kyū as a student of shogi professional Kōji Tanigawa in September 2000. He was promoted to the rank of 3-dan in October 2007, and obtained professional status and the rank of 4-dan in April 2016 after winning the 58th 3-dan League with a record of 14 wins and 4 losses.

Shogi professional
In October 2013, Tonari became the only apprentice professional 3-dan to win the  tournament when he defeated Tetsuya Fujimori 2 games to 1 for the 44th Shinjin-Ō title.

Promotion history
Tonari's promotion history is as follows:

 6-kyū: September 2000
 3-dan: October 2007
 4-dan: April 1, 2016
 5-dan: March 15, 2018
 6-dan: November 13, 2019
 7-dan: March 25, 2021

Titles and other championships
Tonari has yet to appear in a major title match, but he has won one non-major title championship.

Awards and honors
Tonari received the Japan Shogi Association Annual Shogi Award for "Special Game of the Year" for the 2014 Shogi Year for his game against Mitsunori Makino in the Round 2 of the 46th  tournament.

References

External links
ShogiHub: Professional Player Info · Tonari, Ryuuma

1990 births
Japanese shogi players
Living people
Professional shogi players
Professional shogi players from Miyazaki Prefecture
Shinjin-Ō